Wayne Robert Teasdale (16 January 1945 – 20 October 2004) was a Catholic monk, author and teacher from Connecticut, best known as an energetic proponent of mutual understanding between the world's religions, for an interfaith dialogue which he termed "interspirituality". He was also an active campaigner on issues of social justice.

Publications

Books
Essays in Mysticism: Explorations into Contemplative Experience, Foreword by George A. Maloney (Liturgical Publications/Sunday Publications 1982) 
Towards a Christian Vedanta: The Encounter of Hinduism and Christianity according to Bede Griffiths (Asian Trading Corporation 1987)  Developed from his dissertation at Fordham University.
The Mystic Heart: Discovering a Universal Spirituality in the World’s Religions, Foreword by the Dalai Lama, Preface by Beatrice Bruleau (New World Library 1999) 
 A Monk in the World: Cultivating a Spiritual Life, Foreword by Ken Wilber (New World Library 2002) 
Bede Griffiths: An Introduction to his Interspiritual Thought, Foreword by Bede Griffiths (Skylight Paths Publishing 2003) 
Catholicism in Dialogue: Conversations across the Traditions (Rowman & Littlefield Publishers 2004) 
The Mystic Hours: A Daybook of Inspirational Wisdom and Devotion (New World Library 2004)

Editor
The Community of Religions: Voices and Images of the Parliament of the World's Religions,  editor, with George Cairns (Continuum International Publishing Group 1996) 
Awakening the Spirit, Inspiring the Soul: 30 Stories of Interspiritual Discovery in the Community of Faiths, editor, with Martha Howard, Foreword by Joan Borysenko (Skylight Paths Publishing 2004)

References

External links

Interspiritual Dialogue 'n' Action
Memorial site
One Spirit Learning Alliance and Interfaith Seminary website
Order of Universal Interfaith website
Community of the Mystical Heart website
Interspiritual multiplex website
Amy Edelstein's interview with Teasdale 
Universal Declaration on Nonviolence
Review of A Monk in the World
"Determined to be Free" : an interview with ascent magazine.

1945 births
2004 deaths
American religious writers
American spiritual teachers
American spiritual writers
20th-century Christian mystics
Fordham University alumni
DePaul University faculty
Benedictine University faculty
Buddhist and Christian interfaith dialogue
American Christian monks